The BUCS Football League is the association football league system of British Universities and Colleges Sport (BUCS). It is the largest sport in UK higher education, with over 450 men's and women's teams competing in 100 leagues.

Competition format
The league follows the standard BUCS double pyramid, with two Premier divisions (North and South) sitting above five regions (Scottish, Northern, Midlands, Western and South Eastern). There are five divisions, one for each region, in the top regional tier (Tier 1), but at lower tiers the regions may be sub-divided into A, B, etc. divisions on a geographical basis. There are eight levels (Premier to Tier 7) in the men's pyramid and five (Premier to Tier 4) in the women's pyramid.

Divisions each consist of six teams, with the exception of the bottom division in each region. Teams in divisions with six or fewer teams play each other twice, home and away, while teams in divisions with seven or more teams play once, either home or away. All teams from the two Premier divisions enter the knockout Championship, teams in Tier 1 enter the Trophy, and teams in Tier 2 and below enter the Conference Cup. The bottom team from each Premier division and the top first teams from Tier 1 enter a promotion/relegation playoff at the end of the season; promotion and relegation between the regional tiers is automatic.

Former winners

Note: for consistency, current names are used throughout the table, e.g. Leeds Beckett rather than Leeds Met and Cardiff Met rather than UWIC.

External links

References

Football leagues in the United Kingdom
1994 establishments in the United Kingdom
Sports leagues established in 1994
Football